Vincenzo Italiano (born 10 December 1977) is an Italian football manager, who is currently in charge of Serie A club Fiorentina, and a former player.

Playing career
Italiano was born in Karlsruhe, Germany to Sicilian parents originally from Ribera and later moved back to their hometown when he was six months of age. His playing role was of a versatile central midfielder, known for his tackling and passing. He played for Genoa and (for most of his career) Hellas Verona first in Serie A and later, in Serie B.

He made his debut in Serie A with Hellas Verona and then appeared in Serie A again, albeit briefly, with cross-city rivals Chievo on 14 January 2007 against Catania.

Coaching career

Early years
After his retirement as a player, he started a coaching career in Veneto for a number of amateur teams. In 2017 he joined Union ArzignanoChiampo, which won him interest from Serie C club Trapani who hired him for the 2018–19 season.

Under his guidance, Trapani concluded the 2018–19 season in second place behind champions Juve Stabia, and then successfully contested the playoff phase, winning promotion to Serie B after defeating Piacenza 2–0 on aggregate.

Spezia
Following his successful season with Trapani, Italiano was subsequently hired by ambitious Serie B club Spezia, as the club's new head coach for the 2019–20 season.

In his first season in charge, Italiano immediately achieved promotion with Spezia to Serie A for the first time in the club's history after edging Frosinone in the promotion play-offs. He successively guided Spezia in their 2020–21 Serie A campaign, succeeding in keeping the small Ligurian club in the top flight in his debut season in the Italian top division.

Fiorentina
Italiano's successes with Spezia won him interest from Fiorentina, who ultimately signed him as their new head coach on a two-year deal. In his first season in charge, Italiano led Fiorentina to win a spot for the 2022–23 UEFA Europa Conference League, thus marking a return into European football for the Viola after several years. Despite interest from other clubs, Italiano was confirmed as Fiorentina manager for one more season.

Managerial statistics

References

External links

Vincenzo Italiano AIC profile

1977 births
Living people
Italian footballers
Hellas Verona F.C. players
Genoa C.F.C. players
A.C. ChievoVerona players
Calcio Padova players
A.C. Perugia Calcio players
F.C. Lumezzane V.G.Z. A.S.D. players
Serie A players
Serie B players
Association football midfielders
Footballers from Karlsruhe
Serie A managers
Serie B managers
Serie C managers
Spezia Calcio managers
ACF Fiorentina managers
Italian football managers
People of Sicilian descent